Jonathan Leman (born April 15, 1997) is a Swedish ice hockey defenceman. He is currently playing with Narvik Hockey of the GET-ligaen.

Leman made his Swedish Hockey League debut playing with Modo Hockey during the 2014–15 SHL season.

References

External links

1997 births
Living people
AIK IF players
Almtuna IS players
Modo Hockey players
Narvik IK players
Sportspeople from Uppsala
Swedish ice hockey defencemen